Rilwan Adesoji Akanbi (born May 6 1962) is a Nigerian politician and former senator representing Oyo South Senatorial District at the 8th National Assembly. He first served as a Member of the Federal House of Representatives from 1992 to 1993 and was a Special Adviser Industrial and Economic Matters to the Governor of Oyo State Lam Adesina from 1999 to 2003

References 

1962 births
Living people
Oyo State politicians